Charles Albert Abbott (1867-date of death unknown), was a South African international lawn bowls player who competed in the 1934 British Empire Games.

Bowls career
At the 1934 British Empire Games he won the bronze medal in the singles event.

Personal life
He was a building contractor by trade. He was resident in Bournemouth during the Games and travelled to the event with his wife Emma.

References

South African male bowls players
Bowls players at the 1934 British Empire Games
Commonwealth Games bronze medallists for South Africa
Commonwealth Games medallists in lawn bowls
1867 births
Year of death missing
Medallists at the 1934 British Empire Games